Skaidava Bay (‘Zaliv Skaidava’ \'za-liv ska-i-'da-va\) is the  wide bay indenting for  the north coast of Alexander Island, Antarctica  west of the island's northeast extremity Cape Arauco. It is surmounted on the south by Mount Bayonne, the north extremity of Rouen Mountains. The vicinity was visited on 6 January 1988 by the geological survey party of Christo Pimpirev and Borislav Kamenov (First Bulgarian Antarctic Expedition), and Philip Nell and Peter Marquis (British Antarctic Survey).

The feature is named after the ancient Thracian settlement and Roman fortress of Skaidava in Northeastern Bulgaria.

Location

Maps
 British Antarctic Territory. Scale 1:250000 topographic map. Sheet SR19-20/5. APC UK, 1991
 Antarctic Digital Database (ADD). Scale 1:250000 topographic map of Antarctica. Scientific Committee on Antarctic Research (SCAR). Since 1993, regularly upgraded and updated

References
 Bulgarian Antarctic Gazetteer. Antarctic Place-names Commission. (details in Bulgarian, basic data in English)
 Skaidava Bay. SCAR Composite Gazetteer of Antarctica

External links
 Skaidava Bay. Copernix satellite image

Bodies of water of Alexander Island
Landforms of Alexander Island
Bulgaria and the Antarctic